Parque Vía is a Mexican film directed by Enrique Rivero. It won the Golden Leopard at the 2008 Locarno International Film Festival and the Golden Crow Pheasant for Best Film at the 2008 International Film Festival of Kerala.

References

External links

Golden Leopard winners
Mexican drama films
2000s Mexican films